The Speaker of the Uttar Pradesh Legislative Assembly is the presiding officer of the Legislative Assembly of Uttar Pradesh, the main law-making body for the Indian state of Uttar Pradesh. The Speaker is elected in the very first meeting of the Uttar Pradesh Legislative Assembly after the general elections for a term of 5 years from amongst the members of the assembly. Speakers hold office until ceasing to be a member of the assembly or resigning from the office. The Speaker can be removed from office by a resolution passed in the assembly by an effective majority of its members. In the absence of Speaker, the meeting of Uttar Pradesh Legislative Assembly is presided by the Deputy Speaker.

Eligibility
The Speaker of the Assembly:

 Must be a citizen of India;
 Must not be less than 25 years of age; and
 Should not hold any office of profit under the Government of Uttar Pradesh.

Powers and Functions of the Speaker
The speaker of the legislative assembly conducts the business in house, and decides whether a bill is a money bill or not.  They maintain discipline and decorum in the house and can punish a member for their unruly behaviour by suspending them. They also permit the moving of various kinds of motions and resolutions such as a motion of no confidence, motion of adjournment, motion of censure and calling attention notice as per the rules. The speaker decides on the agenda to be taken up for discussion during the meeting. The date of election of the speaker is fixed by the Governor of Uttar Pradesh. Further, all comments and speeches made by members of the House are addressed to the speaker. The speaker is answerable to the house. Both the speaker and deputy speaker may be removed by a resolution passed by the majority of the members.

List of the Speakers of Uttar Pradesh

See also
 Government of Uttar Pradesh
 Governor of Uttar Pradesh
 Chief Minister of Uttar Pradesh
 Uttar Pradesh Legislative Assembly
 Speaker of the Lok Sabha
 Chairman of the Rajya Sabha
 List of current Indian legislative speakers and chairmen

References

U
Lists of people from Uttar Pradesh
 
Uttar Pradesh politics-related lists